Giugliano Calcio 1928 is an Italian association football club based in Giugliano in Campania, in the region of Campania.

History 
The club was founded as Unione Sportiva Fascista Giuglianese in 1928. Giuglianese was admitted to Prima Categoria U.L.I.C. (Free Italian Footballers Union) for the 1928–29 season. In 1929, the team's name was changed to Aurelio Padovani Giugliano and were enrolled in the third regional division championship of the F.I.G.C. and included in Group B.

In 1997-1998 the team won the Scudetto and the Serie D Championship.

In 2022 Giugliano Calcio won Serie D/G, reaching the promotion in Serie C for the next season.

Colors and crest 
Giugliano's colors are blue and yellow. Their circular crest features a prowling tiger and (the year 1928), the original foundation date of the club.

Current squad

Out on loan

Honours

Serie D
Champions (2): 1997–1998, 2021-2022
Scudetto D
Champions: 1997–1998

Bibliography

References

External links
Instagram account
Facebook account

Football clubs in Campania
Giugliano in Campania
Association football clubs established in 1928
Serie C clubs
Serie D clubs
1928 establishments in Italy